Víctor Pacheco may refer to:

 Víctor Pacheco (footballer, born 1972), Uruguayan footballer
 Víctor Pacheco (footballer, born 1974), Colombian footballer